Dhaniakhali railway station is a Kolkata Suburban Railway halt station on the Howrah–Bardhaman chord line operated by Eastern Railway zone of Indian Railways. It is situated beside Chinsurah-Dhaniakhali Road, Rudrani at Dhaniakhali in Hooghly district in the Indian state of West Bengal. It is previously operated by Haradhan Bandyopadhyay who developed the halt station to Aadharsha station.

History
The Howrah–Bardhaman chord, the 95 kilometers railway line was constructed in 1917. It was connected with  through Dankuni after construction of Vivekananda Setu in 1932. Howrah to Bardhaman chord line including Dhaniakhali railway station was electrified in 1964–66. This halt station was inaugurated in December 2003.

References

Railway stations in Hooghly district
Howrah railway division
Kolkata Suburban Railway stations